Ville Hyvärinen (born 6 June 1991) is a Finnish ice hockey defenceman currently playing for Mikkelin Jukurit of the Finnish Liiga.

References

External links
 

1991 births
Living people
Finnish ice hockey defencemen
Hokki players
Iisalmen Peli-Karhut players
Jokipojat players
Mikkelin Jukurit players
KalPa players
KeuPa HT players
Lukko players
People from Kuopio
SaPKo players
Sportspeople from North Savo
21st-century Finnish people